Ridley Creek State Park is a  Pennsylvania state park in Edgmont, Middletown, and Upper Providence Townships, Delaware County, Pennsylvania in the United States. Ridley Creek passes through the park. Highlights include a  paved multi-use trail, a formal garden designed by the Olmsted Brothers, and Colonial Pennsylvania Plantation, which recreates daily life on a pre-Revolutionary farm. The park is adjacent to the John J. Tyler Arboretum.

History
The bulk of the property was acquired in the late 1960s from the estate of well known horse breeder Walter M. Jeffords Sr. and his wife Sarah, a niece of Samuel D. Riddle. By 1918 they had built a large mansion, now the park office, around a stone colonial farmhouse. Twenty-four other historic properties were located on the grounds, many farmsteads that had retained family ownership since the seventeenth century. In 1976 these properties were registered on the National Register of Historic Places as a national historic district.

The area was originally settled by English Quakers and remained agrarian into the twentieth century. The oldest property is the 1683 Worrel House.  In 1718 a water mill, then known as Providence Mill, began to grind corn. In the late 18th century a plaster mill was established next to the grist mill.  A rolling and slitting mill replaced the plaster mill by 1812, and became known as Bishop's Mills.  Workers cottages, a dam, and several outbuildings complete the mill complex, now known as Sycamore Mills.  The mills operated until 1901, when they were damaged by fire.

Colonial Pennsylvania Plantation

The Colonial Pennsylvania Plantation is a living museum on the  farm where the Pratt family lived from 1720 to 1820.  Admission is charged and it is open to the general public on weekends from April through November.

Recreation

The location of Ridley Creek State Park, just  from downtown Philadelphia, has led to its popularity. Ridley Creek is very popular with fishermen. It is stocked  with trout by the Pennsylvania Fish and Boat Commission. A portion of the creek is a designated catch and release area for fly fishing only. There is a wheelchair accessible fishing platform on a multi-use trail. The  of hiking trails at Ridley Creek State Park are popular with dog owners. These trails pass through a variety of habitats. A  multi use trail is open to jogging, bicycling and walking. The park also features a  equestrian trail.

Nearby state parks
The following state parks are within  of Ridley Creek State Park:

Alapocas Run State Park (Delaware)
Auburn Valley State Park (Delaware)
Bellevue State Park (Delaware)
Benjamin Rush State Park (Philadelphia County)
Brandywine Creek State Park (Delaware)
Delaware Canal State Park (Bucks and Northampton Counties)

Evansburg State Park (Montgomery County)
Fort Delaware State Park (Delaware)
Fort DuPont State Park (Delaware)
Fort Mott State Park (New Jersey)
Fort Washington State Park (Montgomery County)
Fox Point State Park (Delaware)
French Creek State Park (Berks and Chester Counties)
Lums Pond State Park (Delaware)
Marsh Creek State Park (Chester County)
Neshaminy State Park (Bucks County)
Norristown Farm Park (Montgomery County)
Wilmington State Parks  (Delaware)
White Clay Creek Preserve (Chester County)
White Clay Creek State Park (Delaware)

References

Sources

[ National Register of Historic Places Inventory - Nomination Form] Jeffords' Estate

External links

 Ridley Creek State Park Official Website
  
 Colonial Pennsylvania Plantation

State parks of Pennsylvania
Protected areas established in 1972
Archaeological sites on the National Register of Historic Places in Pennsylvania
Historic districts on the National Register of Historic Places in Pennsylvania
Parks in Delaware County, Pennsylvania
National Register of Historic Places in Delaware County, Pennsylvania
1972 establishments in Pennsylvania
Protected areas of Delaware County, Pennsylvania
Middletown Township, Delaware County, Pennsylvania